Franklin Fowler Ellsworth (July 10, 1879 – December 23, 1942) was a Representative from Minnesota; born in St. James, Watonwan County, Minnesota, July 10, 1879; attended the grade and high schools; enlisted as a private in Company H, Twelfth Regiment, Minnesota Volunteer Infantry, during the Spanish–American War; attended the law department of the University of Minnesota at Minneapolis; was admitted to the bar in 1901 and commenced practice in St. James; city attorney of St. James in 1904 and 1905; prosecuting attorney of Watonwan County 1905–1909; elected as a Republican to the 64th, 65th, and 66th congresses (March 4, 1915 – March 3, 1921); was not a candidate for renomination in 1920, having become a gubernatorial candidate; unsuccessful candidate for Governor of Minnesota in 1920 and 1924; moved to Minneapolis, Minnesota, in 1921 and resumed the practice of his profession; died in Minneapolis, December 23, 1942; interment in Lakewood Cemetery.

External links

University of Minnesota Law School alumni
1879 births
1942 deaths
Republican Party members of the United States House of Representatives from Minnesota
People from St. James, Minnesota